Moschheim is an Ortsgemeinde – a community belonging to a Verbandsgemeinde – in the Westerwaldkreis in Rhineland-Palatinate, Germany.

Geography

The community lies north of Montabaur on the Kannenbäckerstraße (“Jug Bakers’ Road”, a reference to the local ceramics industry). The community has since 1971 belonged to what was then the newly founded Verbandsgemeinde of Wirges, a kind of collective municipality. Its seat is in the like-named town.

In the north of the municipal area stands the Malberg, which at 422 m above sea level is one of the greatest elevations in the area.

History
In 1362, Moschheim had its first documentary mention.

Politics

The municipal council is made up of 13 council members, including the extraofficial mayor (Bürgermeister), who were elected in a majority vote in a municipal election on 13 June 2004.

Economy and infrastructure

East of the community runs Bundesstraße 255, linking Montabaur and Rennerod. The nearest Autobahn interchange is Montabaur on the A 3 (Cologne–Frankfurt), some 3 km away. The nearest InterCityExpress stop is the railway station at Montabaur on the Cologne-Frankfurt high-speed rail line.

References

External links
 Moschheim 

Municipalities in Rhineland-Palatinate
Westerwaldkreis